The 99s Museum of Women Pilots (MWP) is a non-profit museum and research institute that seeks to preserve the unique history of women in aviation. It is located on the second story of the international headquarters building of the non-profit International Organization of Women Pilots: The Ninety-Nines ("99s") on the grounds of Will Rogers World Airport in Oklahoma City, Oklahoma.  The  museum houses the largest collection of historical women aviator artifacts in the world.

History 
First known as "The Ninety-Nines", the MWP was established in New York City by 99 women pilots during 1929. Its headquarters moved from New York to Oklahoma City in 1955. In 1972, the museum was formally established as the "Resource Center," that included a library, archives, museum and oral/video history collection. The quantity of artifacts soon outgrew its allotted space, so a separate museum was created and opened to the public in 1999.

Collections 
The museum is the only one in the world dedicated to female pilots (another museum focusing on women in aviation is International Women's Air & Space Museum in Cleveland, Ohio). Artifacts include historical papers, personal items, video and oral histories, photos, memorabilia and other notable artifacts from pioneering women aviators worldwide. The museum collection and exhibits provide insight into the role women pilots played in the development of aviation and their historical footprint.  The museum is home to personal artifacts of Amelia Earhart and information about her pioneering aviation career.

The museum is open Monday through Saturday, 9 AM to 5 PM.

References

External links 
 museumofwomenpilots.org

99s Museum of Women Pilots - TravelOK - State of Oklahoma tourism (includes video of museum)
 
 Museum of Women Pilots Director Interview (including displays) - OklaTravelNews (YouTube)

Museums in Oklahoma City
Aerospace museums in Oklahoma
Women's museums in Oklahoma
Museums established in 1999
1999 establishments in Oklahoma
Women aviators
Aviation in Oklahoma